Paris<>Berlin is Stereo Total's 8th album released in 2007.

Track listing
"Miss Rébellion Des Hormones" – 3.12
"Ich Bin Der Stricherjunge" – 2.07
"Plastic" – 2.52
"Komplex Mit Dem Sex" – 2.45
"Lolita Fantôme" – 3.21
"Küsse Aus Der Hölle Der Musik" – 2.26 (The US edition features «Baisers de l’enfer de la musique» instead of «Küsse aus der Hölle der Musik».
"Plus Minus Null" – 2.01
"Mehr Licht" – 3.15
"Ta Voix Au Téléphone" – 2.59
"Patty Hearst" – 2.40
"Baby Revolution" – 3.28
"Relax Baby Be Cool" – 2.32
"Chewinggum" – 2.33
"Moderne Musik" – 2.16

References

2007 albums
Stereo Total albums